Robert Johnstone may refer to:
Robert Maxwell Johnstone (1914–1990), senior British Army officer
Robert Arthur Johnstone (1843–1905), officer in the Native Police paramilitary force
Robert James Johnstone (1872–1938), Northern Ireland physician and politician
Robert William Johnstone (1879–1969), Scottish surgeon
Bobby Johnstone (1929–2001), Scottish footballer (Hibernian, Manchester City, Oldham Athletic, national team)
Bobby Johnstone (1960s footballer) (fl. 1958–1969), Scottish footballer (Stirling Albion, Airdrieonians, Dumbarton)
Bobby Johnstone (footballer, born 1918) (1918–2007), Scottish footballer (Tranmere Rovers)
Bob Johnstone (Australian footballer) (1942–2001), Australian footballer (Collingwood)
Bob Johnstone (broadcaster) (?–2012), Canadian broadcaster
Bob Johnstone (goalkeeper) (fl. 1930s), Scottish footballer (Partick Thistle)
Bob Johnstone (Scottish footballer) (fl. 1890s), Scottish footballer
Bob Johnstone (singer) (1916–1994), American traditional pop music singer

See also
Robert Johnston (disambiguation)